The Jensen Ranch,  southwest of Boulder, Wyoming, USA,  was established by the Danish immigrant Metinus Jensen in 1905. It passed from the family as a working ranch after three generations. The ranch features a 1918 American Foursquare house as its central element, surrounded by accessory ranch buildings.

The Jensen Ranch was established in an unpromising section of Sublette County in sagebrush land. It typifies an early 20th-century ranching operation, that became a successful beef cattle and sheep operation.

Jensen was born on January 14, 1874, in Bramminge, Denmark. He migrated to the United States at the age of nineteen with two brothers. He lived and worked for a time in Nebraska. There he met his wife, a Nebraskan widow named Hannah Percilla Dodd, who already had two children of her own. The Jensens moved to Wyoming in 1900 and eventually had nine more children. he found a job with the Union Pacific Railroad, working at several locations in Wyoming. The ranch passed to his son Otto in 1945, when Metinus and Hannah moved to Rock Springs.

The ranch was placed on the National Register of Historic Places in 1988.

References

External links
 Jensen Ranch at the Wyoming State Historic Preservation Office

Houses on the National Register of Historic Places in Wyoming
Houses in Sublette County, Wyoming
Ranches in Wyoming
Ranches on the National Register of Historic Places in Wyoming
Historic districts on the National Register of Historic Places in Wyoming
National Register of Historic Places in Sublette County, Wyoming